is a station on the Tama Toshi Monorail Line in Tachikawa, Tokyo, Japan. It opened on November 27, 1998.

Lines
Tachihi Station is a station on the Tama Toshi Monorail Line, and is located 3.6 km from the northern terminus of the line at Kamikitadai Station.

Station layout
Tachihi Station is a raised station with two tracks and two opposed side platforms, with the station building located underneath.

Platforms

History
The station opened on 27 November 1998.

Station numbering was introduced in February 2018 with Tachihi being assigned TT14.

Surrounding area

The station is situated above Tokyo Metropolitan Route 43 and adjoins the Lalaport Tachikawa Tachihi shopping mall. Other points of interest include:
 Arena Tachikawa Tachihi
 Tachihi Driving Range
 Shinnyo-en

See also
 List of railway stations in Japan

References

External links

 Tama Monorail Tachihi Station 

Railway stations in Japan opened in 1998
Railway stations in Tokyo
Tama Toshi Monorail
Tachikawa, Tokyo